Just As I Remember is a Canadian documentary film, directed by Andrew Moir and released in 2012. Based on his own desire to better understand his father Don's struggle with amyotrophic lateral sclerosis, which has left him no longer able to communicate, the film depicts the experiences of Brad Katz, a man who is at an earlier stage of the disease.

The film received a Canadian Screen Award nomination for Best Short Documentary Film at the 2nd Canadian Screen Awards, and won the Toronto Film Critics Association's Manulife Award for Best Student Film at the Toronto Film Critics Association Awards 2012.

References

External links
 

2012 films
2012 short documentary films
Canadian short documentary films
Amyotrophic lateral sclerosis
2010s English-language films
2010s Canadian films